Thomas M. Katus (born February 13, 1940) is a former Democratic member of the South Dakota Senate, representing the 32nd district during the 2006 and 2007 legislative sessions.

Katus was defeated for re-election in 2008. He was nominated unopposed to run for state treasurer as the June 2010 Democratic convention, but lost to Rich Sattgast.

References

External links
Campaign website
South Dakota Legislature - Tom Katus Official SD Senate Profile

Follow the Money - Thomas M Katus
2008 2006 campaign contributions

|-

Living people
Democratic Party South Dakota state senators
1940 births